Morus alba, known as white mulberry, common mulberry and silkworm mulberry, is a fast-growing, small to medium-sized mulberry tree which grows to  tall. It is generally a short-lived tree with a lifespan comparable to that of humans, although there are some specimens known to be more than 250 years old. The species is native to China and India and is widely cultivated and naturalized elsewhere (including United States, Mexico, Australia, Kyrgyzstan, Argentina, Turkey, Iran, and many others).

The white mulberry is widely cultivated to feed the silkworms employed in the commercial production of silk. It is also notable for the rapid release of its pollen, which is launched at greater than half the speed of sound. Its berries are edible when ripe.

Description

Generally, the trees are deciduous in temperate regions, but trees grown in tropical regions may be evergreen.

Male and female flowers are usually found on separate trees although they may occur on the same tree. In the wild it is deep purple, but in many cultivated plants it varies from white to pink. It is sweet but bland, unlike the more intense flavor of the red mulberry and black mulberry. The seeds are widely dispersed in the droppings of birds that eat the fruit.

The white mulberry is scientifically notable for the rapid plant movement involved in pollen release from its catkins. The stamens act as catapults, releasing stored elastic energy in just 25 μs.

Taxonomy
Two varieties of Morus alba are recognized:
 Morus alba var. alba
 Morus alba var. multicaulis

Cultivation

Cultivation of white mulberry to nourish silkworms began more than 4,700 years ago in China and has since been introduced in other countries. The Ancient Greeks and Romans cultivated the mulberry for silkworms. At least as early as 220 AD, Emperor Elagabalus wore a silk robe. It was introduced into other parts of Europe in the twelfth century and into Latin America after the Spanish conquest in the fifteenth century. In 2002, 6,260 km2 of land were devoted to the species in China.

It has been grown widely from the Indian subcontinent west through Afghanistan and Iran to southern Europe for more than a thousand years for leaves to feed silkworms.

More recently, it has become widely naturalized in disturbed areas such as roadsides and the edges of tree lots, along with urban areas in much of North America, where it hybridizes readily with the locally native red mulberry (Morus rubra). There is now serious concern for the long-term genetic viability of the red mulberry because of extensive hybridization in some areas.

They thrive in mildly acidic, well drained, sandy loam and clayey loam soils, though they can withstand poor soils as well.

Toxicity
Tests on laboratory rats have not found mulberry extract to present significant toxicity.

According to a coroner's report, Lori McClintock, wife of US politician Tom McClintock, died in December 2021 from dehydration due to gastroenteritis caused by "adverse effects of white mulberry leaf ingestion"; the leaf is used as a dietary supplement or herbal remedy for weight loss and diabetes.

Uses

White mulberry leaves are the preferred feedstock for silkworms, and are also cut for food for livestock (cattle, goats, etc.) in areas where dry seasons restrict the availability of ground vegetation. The leaves are prepared as tea in Korea. The fruit are also eaten, often dried or made into wine.

For landscaping, a fruitless mulberry was developed from a clone for use in the production of silk in the U.S. The industry never materialized, but the mulberry variety is now used as an ornamental tree where shade is desired without the fruit.

A weeping cultivar of white mulberry, Morus alba 'Pendula', is a popular ornamental plant. It was planted at several grand stations built along the Lackawanna Railroad in New Jersey during the late 1800s and early 1900s. The species has become a popular lawn tree across the desert cities of the southwestern United States, prized for its shade and also for its cylindrical berry clusters composed of sweet, purplish-white fruits. The plant's pollen has become problematic in some cities where it has been blamed for an increase in hay fever.

Medicinal
Various extracts from Morus alba including kuwanon G, moracin M, steppogenin-4′-O-β-D-glucoside and mulberroside A have been suggested as having a variety of potentially-useful medical effects. Cyanidin-3-O-beta-ᴅ-glucopyranoside and Sanggenon G extracted from Morus alba were studied in animal models for some effects on the central nervous system, but clinical trials are necessary to confirm the effects.

Morus alba is a traditional Chinese medicine that contains alkaloids and flavonoids that are bioactive compounds. Studies on animal models and human cell lines suggest that these compounds may help reduce high cholesterol, obesity, and stress.

In popular culture
In the 14th century Chinese historical novel Romance of the Three Kingdoms, the big morus alba tree is said to be in Liu Bei's house.
1986 Korean erotic film Mulberry is about a woman who picks mulberry leaves to feed silkworms.

See also
Blackberry which looks similar
Silkworms 
Sericulture 
The red mulberry 
The black mulberry 
Osage orange

Gallery

References

External links 

 USDA Plants Profile for Morus alba white mulberry
 
 Morton Arboretum: Diagnostic photos of white mulberry tree (acc. 380*82-1)
 Invasive.org: U.S. National Forest Service, Invasive Species Weed of the Week − Morus alba

alba
Endemic flora of China
Flora of North-Central China
Trees of China
Crops originating from China
Sericulture
Plants described in 1753
Taxa named by Carl Linnaeus
Plants used in traditional Chinese medicine
Fruit trees